La Verpillière is a commune in the Isère department in southeastern France.

La Verpillière railway station on the line between Lyon and Grenoble is located to the south-east of the town center.

Geography
The Bourbre flows northwest through the northern part of the commune.

Population

See also
Communes of the Isère department

References

Communes of Isère
Isère communes articles needing translation from French Wikipedia